Francesco Montanari (born 4 October 1984) is an Italian actor.

Early life
Montanari graduated from the Accademia Nazionale di Arte Drammatica Silvio D'Amico.

Career
He appeared in student director Jacopo Bezzi's I bambini di sale ("Children of Salt") and then became known for his portrayal of Il Libanese ("The Lebanese") in the TV series Romanzo Criminale ("Criminal Novel"), a TV series inspired by the true story of the Banda della Magliana, an Italian criminal organisation.

He played Attilio Panecci in the 2009 film Oggi sposi ("Just Married"). He also played Girolamo Savonarola in the third season of Medici: the Magnificent, the spin-off of the Medici: Masters of Florence (2016).

Personal life
He married Andrea Delogu in 2016.

References

External links

Italian male actors
Living people
1984 births
Accademia Nazionale di Arte Drammatica Silvio D'Amico alumni